John Christou is a former Australian rules footballer, who played for the Fitzroy Football Club in the Victorian Football League (VFL). He is the brother of fellow Fitzroy player Jim.

References

External links

1955 births
Living people
Fitzroy Football Club players
Heidelberg Football Club players
Australian rules footballers from Victoria (Australia)